Satan Takes a Holiday is an album by Anton Szandor LaVey, released through Amarillo Records in 1995. The collection is an eclectic body of songs LaVey constructed using his synthesizer. A few of these songs are standards, and their composers well known. Nevertheless, LaVey chose all these songs to create deliberate modes of feeling and mood. His original treatments of many of these songs, and others similar to them in context and style, were performed on a variety of organs that he mastered over the course of his life. He performed many such songs in burlesque houses, various circuses, carnivals, and roadhouses.

LaVey is joined on this recording by Blanche Barton, High Priestess of the Church of Satan and Nick Bougas, director of LaVey's film biography, Speak of the Devil: The Canon of Anton LaVey.

Track listing
"Satan Takes a Holiday" – written in 1937 by bandleader Larry Clinton. Arranged for Hammond Novacord. Originally used as background music for "magic acts and midnight spook shows".
"Answer Me" – A German love song from 1953 by Gerhard Winkler and Fred Rauch, with a translation by Carl Sigman. Vocal by A. LaVey.
"The Whirling Dervish" – Written in 1938 by Harry Warren and Al Dubin for the film Garden of the Moon.
"Chloe, or the Song of the Swamp" – Written by Gus Kahn and Neil Moret in 1927. This is a tale of lost love told from the perspective of the abandoned one. Vocal by N. Bougas.
"Thine Alone" – Bombastic version of a 1917 piece by Victor Herbert and Henry Blossom, for stage show, called Eileen.
"Golden Earrings" – Written by Jay Livingston and Ray Evans for the film of the same name, starring Marlene Dietrich. Vocal by A. LaVey, credited as "The Tipsy Gypsy".
"The More I See You" – Written by Harry Warden with words by Mack Gordon. Vocal by N. Bougas.
"Band Organ Medley
"Money in My Clothes" – A 1934 song written by Irving Kahal and Sammy Fain.
"Taboo" – 1941 piece by M. Lecuona.
"Giovanni" – Standard Band Organ Waltz composer and date unknown
"Yankee Rose" – by Abe Frankel and Sidney Holden, written in 1926.
"Hello, Central, Give Me No Man's Land" – Written by Sam L. Lewis, Joe Young, and Jean Schwartz about a young boy trying to use the telephone to talk to his father who's been killed in the war. Vocal by A. LaVey
"Blue Prelude" – 1933 suicide song by Gordon Jenkins and Joe Bishop. Vocal by B. Barton.
"Softly, as in a Morning Sunrise" – By Sigmund Romberg and Oscar Hammerstein II, for the 1928 operetta, "The New Moon". A song about love's betrayal. Vocal by N. Bougas.
"Honolulu Baby" – Written by T. Marvin Hatley in 1933 as background music for the Laurel and Hardy comedy, Sons of the Desert. Vocal by A. LaVey.
"Variations on the Mooche" – Written by Duke Ellington and Irving Mills, 1928 and favored by exotic dancers.
"Here Lies Love" – Suicide song written by Leo Robin and Ralph Rainger for the 1933 film, The Big Broadcast. Vocal by N. Bougas.
"Dixie" – Written by Daniel Emmett in 1860. Vocal by N. Bougas.
"If You Were the Only Girl in the World" – By Nat D. Ayer and Clifford Grey, 1916. Vocal by A. LaVey.
"Satan Takes a Holiday (reprise)" – Vocal treatment of title track by Blanche Barton.
"Satanis Theme" – Written in 1968 by LaVey for the film, Satanis.

The information for the track listings were lifted, at times verbatim, from the liner notes for the CD of this release. Copyright Amarillo Records, 1995.

Usage 
Figure skating world champion Javier Fernández performed his short program to "Satan Takes a Holiday" during the 2013-14 season, including the XXII Olympic Winter Games in Sochi. The program was choreographed by David Wilson.

Release notes
 Originally released by Amarillo Records in 1995.
 Re-released in 2002 by Reptilian Records.

References

1995 albums
Works by Anton LaVey
Amarillo Records albums